John Henry Days is a 2001 novel by American author Colson Whitehead. This is his second full-length work.

Plot summary
Building the railways that made America, John Henry died with a hammer in his hand moments after competing against a steam drill in a battle of endurance. The story of his death made him a legend. Over a century later, freelance journalist J. Sutter is sent to West Virginia to cover the launch of a new postage stamp at the first John Henry Days festival.

Reception
Maya Jaggi, writing for The Guardian, praised John Henry Days, writing that it is "propelled by the quality of the writing and observation which, together with his serious intent, elevate it above frothier social satire." Writing in The New York Times, novelist Jonathan Franzen likened the novel to Ulysses and Moby-Dick in its "encyclopedic aspirations", but added: "John Henry Days is funny and wise and sumptuously written, but it's only rarely a page turner."

Honors

References

External links
 John Henry Days Discussion Guide

2001 American novels
Novels by Colson Whitehead
Novels set in West Virginia
Doubleday (publisher) books